Antoine François Mathieu van Renterghem, known as Toine van Renterghem (17 April 1885 – 1 March 1967) was a Dutch international footballer who earned three caps for the national side between 1906 and 1907. Van Renterghem played club football for HBS Craeyenhout. He was also part of the Dutch squad for the football tournament at the 1908 Summer Olympics, but he did not play in any matches.

References

External links
 Profile at VoetbalStats.nl

1885 births
1967 deaths
Dutch footballers
Netherlands international footballers
Footballers at the 1908 Summer Olympics
Olympic footballers of the Netherlands
Olympic bronze medalists for the Netherlands
Olympic medalists in football
Sportspeople from Goes
HBS Craeyenhout players
Association football forwards
Medalists at the 1908 Summer Olympics
Footballers from Zeeland